Stumpffia pygmaea is a species of frog in the family Microhylidae. It is endemic to Madagascar, where it is known from only two islands, Nosy Be and Nosy Komba. Its natural habitats are subtropical or tropical moist lowland forests, plantations.

Stumpffia pygmaea is a terrestrial microhylid frog. Its natural habitats are subtropical or tropical moist lowland forests, plantations, and heavily degraded former forest. It is threatened by habitat loss.

Sources

References

External links
 

Stumpffia
Amphibians described in 1991
Taxonomy articles created by Polbot